Steven Joseph Silva (born November 27, 1986 in Oceanside, California) is a Filipino-American footballer from Team Socceroo FC in the UFL Second Division. He is also an actor, chef, radio disk jockey, and the Ultimate Male Survivor of the fifth season of StarStruck. He is half-Portuguese, one-fourth Chinese and one-fourth Filipino. He is the first Mindanao representative and the oldest male contestant to win the said title.

Biography

Early life and career beginnings
Steven Silva was born in Oceanside, California to an American father of Portuguese descent and a Filipino-Chinese mother who hails from Davao, where he auditioned for StarStruck. He was raised in Sacramento, California and attended Sacramento City College for his college education.  After a few years there he opted for a career in the culinary field and later attended the California Culinary Academy in San Francisco.

2009–2010: StarStruck
While Steven was completing his foreign internship at the Marco Polo Hotel in Davao as required by the California Culinary Academy in order to graduate, he auditioned for the show by participating in an audition at SM Davao.

Steven was among the hundreds who made it to the callbacks for Manila. He represented Davao.

During the 3rd factor week, Steven had the weakest performance among the remaining boys in the competition. But due to the twist of 3rd factor which gives a different weight of criteria, Steven survived the said week. On the other hand, the result went to Piero Vergara as the latest avenger by then with Princess Snell. Steven admitted that if it was not because of the twist, he knew that he will be sent home instead of Vergara.

His female counterpart in winning the title is Sarah Lahbati.

2010–2014: Post StarStruck
Right after winning the title, Steven and Sarah Lahbati started to appear in numerous shows of GMA. They also performed in the final episode of SOP. After several weeks, Steven became part of Party Pilipinas. Enzo Pineda, Diva Montelaba, Sarah Lahbati, and Silva starred in the Philippine drama anthology and romantic television show, Love Bug series in the episode "Exchange of Hearts". Steven also shared his comedic capabilities as an actor in Bubble Gang and Kaya ng Powers as a guest. And in October 2010, Steven starred in his first lead man role and his biggest break yet with Rocco Nacino, opposite Kris Bernal, in the afternoon soap, Koreana, as Joshua Lee, a rich bachelor who manages the restaurants of a Korean business tycoon Chang Hee-Jung (portrayed by Eddie Garcia).

In mid-2011, Steven starred as John in his first prime time series, Time of My Life. He portrayed the role as the boyfriend of Zaira (portrayed by LJ Reyes). Steven had a supporting role in this series but he said that Rocco Nacino and Mark Herras are the perfect lead men since the said show is all about dancing.

2012 proved to be the busiest year so far for Steven. He portrayed the role of Stripe in the Young Artists Production's staging of Trina Paulus' novel Hope for the Flowers. Frencheska Farr, on the other hand, played the female lead role. The reason behind Silva's inclusion in the said stage play is because of his singing ability in Party Pilipinas. The producers of the stage play like his singing in the said musical variety show ended up asking Steven to audition.  He served his friend, Gian Magdangal, as his inspiration in the play because Magdangal starred in the 2011 play, Rent. He admitted he was hesitant to accept the project when Young Artists Production first offered him the role but later on decided that he was ready to try something new. Being a neophyte in the world of musical theater was not an excuse for Steven for he proved to everyone that the role of Stripe suited him perfectly.

Steven was seen in the Filipino teen-oriented drama series, Together Forever, led by Elmo Magalona and Julie Anne San Jose, as Cholo. In August 2012, Steven also starred in his first film, entitled Just One Summer also led by Magalona and San Jose. In the last quarter of 2012, Steven was part of the Filipino version of The 1st Shop of Coffee Prince where he portrayed Bamboo, a friend of Errol (portrayed by Benjamin Alves). The role of Bamboo was not in the original series.

In January 2013, Steven became a part of the second epicserye of GMA Network, Indio, with Senator Bong Revilla Jr. as the lead character. Indio premiered on January 14, 2013. He played the role of Ribung Linti, the god of lightning and thunder. After Indio, Steven is currently seen as Tisoy in another Rocco Nacino – Lovi Poe tandem series, Akin Pa Rin ang Bukas, as Jerry's (Nacino) buddy. On July, Steven started to become part of Sunday All Stars.

2014–present: Theater, musical, and a Wattpad series
In late 2013, Steven was announced as one of the newest characters in the spin-off of The Kitchen Musical entitled The Boston. For the audition on the said series, Steven said, "The audition experience for The Boston was really nerve-wracking and long, but in the end, it was completely worth it. My first audition was conducted in September 2013. After numerous callbacks, I learned I was part of the final cast. It was a very thorough process and I could tell they really wanted to make sure that each character was to be filled by the right actor." He played the role of Sid which is considered to be an intriguing character of the series. He adds, "The character I play in The Boston is named ‘Sid’ and he is the pastry chef in the restaurant. He is one of the more skilled chefs in the kitchen, yet he is very soft-spoken and doesn't necessarily take command even though he is more than qualified to do so. He is also very particular to his sense of style and physical upkeep and appearance. In a sense, he is very metrosexual and very mysterious so some folks suspect he’s gay, yet no one really knows the truth."  The eight-episode chef themed television series aired through the Lifestyle Network.

While Steven is portraying his role in The Boston, he becomes part of the lifestyle and food show Taste Buddies. The show is being aired in GMA News TV with Solenn Heussaff and Isabelle Daza. Steven serves as a segment host. The show is all about exploring the wonders of the food in the whole country. Iya Villania replaced Daza as Solenn's partner when Isabelle Daza transferred to ABS-CBN.

In early 2015, Steven became part of the musical theater, La Cage aux Folles, where he portrayed the role of Jean-Michel. Jean-Michel is Georges' son from a short-lived affair twenty-four years ago. Georges is the character of the veteran actor, Michael De Mesa. The show's director, Robbie Guevarra, gave the role of Jean-Michel to Steven when Steven was singing during the Grease's rehearsal in 2014. That was the moment Guevarra told Santi Santamaria, 9 Works Theatrical’s executive producer, that he wanted Silva to portray the said role. Steven auditioned by singing 'Beauty School Dropout' and subsequently getting the role.

La Cage aux Folles premiered on February 28, 2015, with a standing ovation from the members of the press. The musical was shown at the Carlos P Romulo Auditorium in RCBC Plaza with Audie Gemora starring as Albin. The show was produced by 9 Works Theatrical, with direction by Robbie Guevara and scenography by Mio Infante. Silva impressed the audience with his powerful singing voice and confidence, holding his own against the acclaimed veterans of the cast.

Personal life
Steven started to reside in Quezon City after winning, leaving his family in Sacramento, California, while he continues to pursue his dream of success in the Philippine world of showbiz.

In 2012, Steven admitted that he and his batch mate, Diva Montelaba are in an "almost-one-year" relationship.

Filmography

Television

Movies

Theater

See also
 Mark Herras
 Mike Tan
 Marky Cielo
 Aljur Abrenica

External links
Steven Silva at GMANetwork.com

Notes

References

1986 births
Living people
American people of Chinese descent
American expatriates in the Philippines
American sportspeople of Filipino descent
California Culinary Academy alumni
American people of Portuguese descent
StarStruck (Philippine TV series) participants
StarStruck (Philippine TV series) winners
Filipino people of American descent
Filipino people of Chinese descent
Filipino people of Portuguese descent
American male actors of Filipino descent
Filipino male film actors
Filipino male models
Filipino chefs
Sportspeople from Oceanside, California
Soccer players from Sacramento, California
Participants in Philippine reality television series
Reality show winners
GMA Network personalities
Team Socceroo F.C. players
Association footballers not categorized by position
Association football players not categorized by nationality
Filipino male television actors
Filipino male stage actors